is a 1957 black and white Japanese film directed by Ishirō Honda.

Cast

References

External links

 わが胸に虹は消えず　第一部 http://www.jmdb.ne.jp/1957/cg002670.htm
 わが胸に虹は消えず　第二部 http://www.jmdb.ne.jp/1957/cg002680.htm

1957 films
1950s Japanese-language films
Films directed by Ishirō Honda
Japanese black-and-white films
1950s Japanese films